Castle of Deception may refer to:

 Castle of Deception (play), a play by Peter Philip
 Castle of Deception (novel), a novel set in the Bard's Tale universe